The Amalgamations Group (a.k.a. Simpson Group) is an Indian business conglomerate based in Chennai which has several business interests in Manufacturing Tractors, Automobile ancillaries, Plantation, Trading and services. The most notable being the Tractors and Farm Equipment Limited (Better known as TAFE), Simpsons & Company, Bimetal Bearings, India Pistons, T. Stanes & Co, Amco Batteries, Higginbotham's and Addisons Paint. The group today has over 47 companies with 50 manufacturing plants.

History
The Amalgamations Group was established by S. Anantharamakrishnan who during the early 1940s was a Director at Simpsons & Co. In 1945 he took over the management and later consolidated several British owned companies with interests in plantation, engineering, trading and services. According to popular Chennai historian S. Muthiah, the successful takeover was the result of an overheard conversation at a Hotel Connemara.

External links
 Official website

References

Engineering companies of India
Companies based in Chennai
Conglomerate companies established in 1945
Diesel engine manufacturers
Indian companies established in 1945
Companies listed on the Bombay Stock Exchange